Aemilia crassa is a moth of the family Erebidae. It was described by Francis Walker in 1865. It is found in Colombia.

References

Moths described in 1865
Phaegopterina
Moths of South America